Żytowań  is a village in the administrative district of Gmina Gubin, within Krosno Odrzańskie County, Lubusz Voivodeship, in western Poland, close to the German border. As of 2011, it had a population of 211.

References

Villages in Krosno Odrzańskie County